Trichohippopsis magna is a species of beetle in the family Cerambycidae. It was described by Martins and Carvalho in 1983.

References

Agapanthiini
Beetles described in 1983